43rd BSFC Awards
December 11, 2022

Best Film: 
Return to Seoul

The 43rd Boston Society of Film Critics Awards, honoring the best in filmmaking in 2022, were given on December 11, 2022.

Winners

 Best Picture:
 Return to Seoul
 Best Director:
 Todd Field – Tár
 Best Actor:
 Colin Farrell – After Yang / The Banshees of Inisherin
 Best Actress:
 Michelle Yeoh – Everything Everywhere All at Once
 Best Supporting Actor:
 Ke Huy Quan – Everything Everywhere All at Once
 Best Supporting Actress:
 Kerry Condon – The Banshees of Inisherin
 Best Original Screenplay:
 Martin McDonagh – The Banshees of Inisherin
 Best Adapted Screenplay:
 Kogonada – After Yang
 Best Animated Film:
 Turning Red
 Best Documentary:
 All the Beauty and the Bloodshed
 Best English Language Film:
 The Banshees of Inisherin
 Best Cinematography:
 Eliot Rockett – Pearl / X
 Best Film Editing (TIE):
 Blair McClendon – Aftersun / Kim Sang-bum – Decision to Leave
 Best Original Score:
 M. M. Keeravani – RRR
 Best New Filmmaker:
 Charlotte Wells – Aftersun
 Best Ensemble Cast (TIE):
 Jackass Forever / Women Talking

References

External links
 Official website

2022
2022 film awards
2022 awards in the United States
2022 in Boston
December 2022 events in the United States